To Life (original title: À la vie) is a 2014 French drama film directed and co-written by Jean-Jacques Zilbermann. The film was presented in the Piazza Grande section at the 2014 Locarno International Film Festival. The film stars Julie Depardieu, Johanna ter Steege and Suzanne Clément.

Plot 
The film was inspired by the story of Irene Zilbermann, the director's mother, a Holocaust survivor, although the names are changed and particulars fictionalized.

Three women who met in Auschwitz reconnect 15 years later during a seaside holiday in Berck-Plage.

Cast 
 Julie Depardieu as Hélène
 Johanna ter Steege as Lili
 Suzanne Clément as Rose
 Hippolyte Girardot as Henri
 Mathias Mlekuz as Raymond
 Benjamin Wangermée as Pierre

Accolades

References

External links 
  (international)
  (United States)
 
 Cineuropa
 UniFrance

2014 films
2010s French-language films
French drama films
Films set in 1960
2010s female buddy films
Holocaust films
Drama films based on actual events
French female buddy films
2014 drama films
Films directed by Jean-Jacques Zilbermann
2010s French films